Roineabhal is a hill in Harris, in the Western Isles of Scotland. The granite on the summit plateau of the mountain is anorthosite, and is similar in composition to rocks found in the mountains of the Moon.

The area is part of the South Lewis, Harris and North Uist National Scenic Area.

It is the site of the original Lingerbay 'superquarry' planning application, submitted in 1991 and finally withdrawn in 2004.

References
 McKirdy, Alan Gordon, John & Crofts, Roger (2007) Land of Mountain and Flood: The Geology and Landforms of Scotland. Edinburgh. Birlinn.

Footnotes

Mountains and hills of the Outer Hebrides
Harris, Outer Hebrides
Marilyns of Scotland